Artyom Alekseyevich Shabolin (born 19 July 2000) is a Russian football player. He plays for FC Novosibirsk.

Club career
He made his debut in the Russian Professional Football League for FC Nosta Novotroitsk on 16 September 2018 in a game against FC Syzran-2003.

On 27 June 2019, he signed a long-term contract with Russian Premier League club FC Ural Yekaterinburg. He made his debut for the main squad of FC Ural Yekaterinburg on 25 September 2019 in a Russian Cup game against FC Chernomorets Novorossiysk. He made his Russian Premier League debut on 14 March 2020 in a game against FC Zenit Saint Petersburg, substituting Nikolay Dimitrov in the 67th minute.

References

External links
 Profile by Russian Professional Football League
 
 
 

2000 births
Sportspeople from Barnaul
Living people
Russian footballers
Association football midfielders
FC Ural Yekaterinburg players
FC Yenisey Krasnoyarsk players
FC Orenburg players
FC Nosta Novotroitsk players
Russian Premier League players
Russian First League players
Russian Second League players